The 11th Asian Cross Country Championships took place on March 24, 2012 in Qingzhen, China. Team rankings were decided by a combination of each nation's top three athletes finishing positions. The same city went on to hold the 2015 IAAF World Cross Country Championships three years later.

Medalists

Medal table

References
Krishnan, Ram. Murali (2012-03-25). Bahrain dominates at Asian XC champs. IAAF. Retrieved on 2012-03-26.

Asian Cross Country Championships
Asian Cross Country
Asian Cross Country
Asian Cross Country
Sport in Guizhou
International athletics competitions hosted by China